Sidcup railway station serves Sidcup, south-east London, within the London Borough of Bexley.

It is in Travelcard Zone 5, and the station is managed by Southeastern.

History
Sidcup station opened on 1 September 1866 with the opening of the Dartford Loop Line. It had a small goods yard positioned on the down side and a station master's house. A new booking office was built in 1887. In the early 1890s a signal box was built on the up side which was in use until November 1970. A station hotel was built near the entrance to the goods yard. The hotel was demolished in 1975.
 
In the 1930s the station was partially rebuilt with new platform canopies. In 1955 the platforms were lengthened to take ten coach trains. In 1965 a footbridge was constructed between the up and down platforms which allowed the closure of the down side booking office. The goods yard closed in August 1966. The following year a short turnback siding was opened at a cost of £50,000 on the down side to the east of the platforms on part of the former goods yard. This enabled services to start or terminate from the station without blocking the main running lines. It was extended in 2013 to accommodate 12 car trains. The remaining area of the goods yard became a car park.

In 1988 a new brick built entrance and booking hall with a glazed pitched-roof opened on the up side. In 1992 the platforms were extended to take twelve coach trains.

In January 2017 the old cross-platform bridge was fully removed, with the new bridge built further along the platform.

Location

Connections
London Buses routes 51, 160, 229, 233, 269, 286 and 492 serve the station.

Facilities
The station has two platforms, platform 1 being for trains to Central London via Hither Green and platform 2 for trains to Dartford, Woolwich Arsenal and to Gravesend.

Facilities at the station include a mini cafe, a small newsagents, ticket booths, photo booth and toilets. There are also free bike racks and a car park. The station has ticket gates on both up and down platforms, although the down side gates are rarely used outside peak hours.

Services

The typical off-peak service in trains per hour is:

The station is also served by a single peak hour return service between Dartford and London Blackfriars.

References

External links

Railway stations in the London Borough of Bexley
Former South Eastern Railway (UK) stations
Railway stations in Great Britain opened in 1866
Railway stations served by Southeastern
Railway station
1866 establishments in England